The Assy-Turgen Observatory (ATO), Full name: Academician Omarov Assy-Turgen Observatory, is an astronomical observatory located in the Assy-Turgen region not far from Almaty, Kazakhstan, within a national park.  The nearest city is Esik. The observatory is operated by the Fesenkov Astrophysical Institute. Time zone is GMT+6.

General information

The process of building began in 1975. The first observations took place in 1981 via telescope - Zeiss-1000. In the beginning of 80s of the last century the process of building of 1.5-m telescope dome began. The dome was 45 meters (148 ft) in height, but due to total crisis (because of Soviet Union collapse) the process of building was frozen in 1992 and only 22 years latter in 2014 continued. In 2015 main (parabolic) mirror with diameter 1.5 meters (61 in) was installed on the telescope AZT-20. First light AZT-20 saw in October 2016. Since 2017 at the regular exploitation. 

According to the website of the Fesenkov Astrophysical Institute, the observatory has low turbulence—i.e., good astronomical seeing.

On the territory of the Assy-Turgen observatory, the average FWHM value is <2 ″, which is considered the best astroclimatic conditions in Kazakhstan. High transparency and low turbulence of air masses, absence of light pollution create favorable conditions for observational astrophysics.

Instruments

Telescope Carl Zeiss-1000 
 Type: reflector
 Optical system: Ritchey–Chrétien 
 Main mirror diameter: D = 1016 mm
 Equivalent focal length: F = 13300 mm
 English mount
 Year of exploitation beginning: 1981 
 Equipment: slit spectrograph UAGS, set of BVR-filters for photometry, CCD-cameras (SBIG ST-7, SBIG ST-8)
 Current status: no observations, under reconstruction

Telescope AZT-20 
 Type: reflector
 Optical system: Cassegrain
 Main mirror diameter: D = 1560 mm
 Focal length with focus corrector: F = 5720 mm
 Maximal possible field of view: FOW = 60 х 60 arc min
 German type equatorial mount
 Year of exploitation beginning: 2017 
 Equipment: CCD-camera for photometry FLI Pro LIne with g’r’i’z’ - filters. In 2021 are planned to install a spectrograph with volume-phase gratings (VPH). 
 Current status: regular observations take place

Telescope CDK-700 
 Type: reflector
 Optical system: Ritchey–Chrétien 
 Main mirror diameter: D = 700 mm
 Equivalent focal length: F = 4540 mm
 Maximal possible field of view: FOW = 30 х 30 arc min
 Alt-Azimuth mount
 Year of exploitation beginning: 2018

Current status: regular observations take place, the telescope belongs to Energetic Cosmos Laboratory of Nazarbaev university.

Gallery

References 

Astronomical observatories in Kazakhstan
Buildings and structures completed in 1991
Astronomical observatories built in the Soviet Union